A special representative of the Secretary-General is a highly respected expert who has been appointed by the Secretary-General of the United Nations to represent them in meetings with heads of state on critical human rights issues. The representatives can carry out country visits to investigate alleged violations of human rights and act as negotiators on behalf of the United Nations.

Current Special Representatives
Special Representatives active  include:
 Virginia Gamba de Potgieter, Special Representative of the Secretary-General for Children and Armed Conflict (SRSG/CAAC), appointed 12 April 2017 
 Natalia Gherman, Special Representative of the Secretary-General for Central Asia and Head of the United Nations Regional Centre for Preventive Diplomacy for Central Asia, appointed 15 September 2017 
 Nicholas Haysom, Special Representative of the Secretary-General for South Sudan and Head of the United Nations Mission in South Sudan (UNMISS), appointed 15 January 2021 
 Jeanine Hennis-Plasschaert, Special Representative of the Secretary-General and Head of the United Nations Assistance Mission for Iraq (UNAMI), appointed 31 August 2018
 Alexander Ivanko, Special Representative of the Secretary-General for Western Sahara and Head of the United Nations Mission for the Referendum in Western Sahara (MINURSO), appointed 27 August 2021
 Bintou Keita, Special Representative of the Secretary-General in the Democratic Republic of the Congo and Head of the United Nations Organization Stabilization Mission in the Democratic Republic of the Congo (MONUSCO), appointed 14 January 2021
 Helen Ruth Meagher La Lime, Special Representative of the Secretary-General for Haiti and Head of the United Nations Integrated Office in Haiti (BINUH), appointed 14 October 2019
 Najat Maalla M'jid, Special Representative of the Secretary-General on Violence Against Children (SRSG/VAC), appointed 30 May 2019
 Annadif Mahamat Saleh, Special Representative of the Secretary-General for West Africa and the Sahel and Head of the United Nations Office for West Africa and the Sahel, appointed 26 March 2021
 Mami Mizutori, Special Representative of the Secretary-General for Disaster Risk Reduction (UNDRR), appointed 31 January 2018
 Damilola Ogunbiyi, Special Representative of the Secretary-General for Sustainable Energy for All (SEforALL), appointed October 2019
 Parfait Onanga-Anyanga, Special Representative of the Secretary-General to the African Union and Head of the United Nations Office to the African Union, appointed 22 February 2022
 Pramila Patten, Special Representative of the Secretary-General on Sexual Violence in Conflict (SRSG/SVC), appointed 12 April 2017
 Volker Perthes, Special Representative of the Secretary-General for Sudan and Head of the United Nations Integrated Transition Assistance Mission in Sudan (UNITAMS), appointed 7 January 2021
 Valentine Rugwabiza, Special Representative of the Secretary-General for the Central African Republic and Head of the United Nations Multidimensional Integrated Stabilization Mission in the Central African Republic (MINUSCA)
 Carlos Ruiz Massieu, Special Representative of the Secretary-General for Colombia and Head of the United Nations Verification Mission in Colombia, appointed 10 December 2018
 Colin Stewart, Special Representative of the Secretary-General and Head of the United Nations Peacekeeping Force in Cyprus (UNFICYP) and Deputy to the Secretary-General’s Special Adviser on Cyprus, appointed 4 November 2021 
 El Ghassim Wane, Special Representative of the Secretary-General for Mali and Head of the United Nations Multidimensional Integrated Stabilization Mission in Mali, appointed 15 March 2021 
 Caroline Ziadeh, Special Representative of the Secretary-General and Head of the United Nations Interim Administration Mission in Kosovo (UNMIK), appointed November 2021

Deputy Special Representatives 

 Adam Abdelmoula, Deputy Special Representative of the Secretary-General for Somalia and Resident and Humanitarian Coordinator in the United Nations Assistance Mission in Somalia (UNSOM), appointed 28 August 2019
 Ramiz Alakbarov, Deputy Special Representative of the Secretary-General for Afghanistan with the United Nations Assistance Mission in Afghanistan (UNAMA) and Resident and Humanitarian Coordinator in Afghanistan, appointed 21 December 2020
 Giovanie Biha, Deputy Special Representative of the Secretary-General for West Africa and the Sahel, United Nations Office for West Africa and the Sahel (UNOWAS), appointed 25 June 2020
 Denise Brown, Deputy Special Representative of the Secretary-General for the United Nations Multidimensional Integrated Stabilization Mission in the Central African Republic (MINUSCA), Resident and Humanitarian Coordinator for the Central African Republic, appointed 21 March 2019
 Guang Cong, Deputy Special Representative of the Secretary-General (Political) for South Sudan and Deputy Head of the United Nations Mission in South Sudan (UNMISS), appointed 24 March 2020
 Lizbeth Anne Cullity, Deputy Special Representative of the Secretary-General and Deputy Head for the United Nations Multidimensional Integrated Stabilization Mission in the Central African Republic (MINUSCA), appointed 8 January 2020
 Khassim Diagne, Deputy Special Representative of the Secretary-General for Protection and Operations in the United Nations Stabilization Mission in the Democratic Republic of the Congo (MONUSCO), appointed 26 January 2021
 Barrie Lynne Freeman, Deputy Special Representative of the Secretary-General for the United Nations Interim Administration Mission in Kosovo (UNMIK), appointed 22 December 2020
 Anita Kiki Gbeho, Deputy Special Representative of the Secretary-General for Somalia, appointed 30 December 2020, and Officer-in-Charge of the United Nations Assistance Mission in Somalia (UNSOM), since 28 October 2022
 Daniela Kroslak, Deputy Special Representative of the Secretary-General for the United Nations Multidimensional Integrated Stabilization Mission in Mali (MINUSMA), appointed 7 January 2022
 Bruno Lemarquis, Deputy Special Representative of the Secretary-General in the United Nations Organization Stabilization Mission in the Democratic Republic of the Congo (MONUSCO) and Resident and Humanitarian Coordinator in the Democratic Republic of the Congo, appointed 18 January 2022
 Khardiata Lô N'Diaye, Deputy Special Representative of the Secretary-General for Sudan with the United Nations Integrated Transition Assistance Mission in Sudan (UNITAMS) and Resident and Humanitarian Coordinator in Sudan, appointed 18 February 2021
 Alain Noudéhou, Deputy Special Representative of the Secretary-General for the United Nations Multidimensional Integrated Stabilization Mission in Mali (MINUSMA) and Resident and Humanitarian Coordinator in Mali, appointed 28 April 2021
 Sara Beysolow Nyanti, Deputy Special Representative of the Secretary-General in the United Nations Mission in South Sudan (UNMISS) and Resident and Humanitarian Coordinator in South Sudan, appointed 6 December 2021
 Markus Potzel, Deputy Special Representative of the Secretary-General (Political) for Afghanistan in the United Nations Assistance Mission in Afghanistan (UNAMA), appointed 17 June 2022
 Ingeborg Richardson, Deputy Special Representative of the Secretary-General for the United Nations Integrated Office in Haiti (BINUH) and Resident and Humanitarian Coordinator in Haiti, appointed 12 May 2022
 Raúl Rosende Rodriguez, Deputy Special Representative in the United Nations Verification Mission in Colombia, appointed 15 March 2022
 Irena Vojáčková-Sollorano, Deputy Special Representative of the Secretary-General for Iraq and in the United Nations Assistance Mission for Iraq (UNAMI) and Resident and Humanitarian Coordinator in Iraq, appointed 2 July 2020

Former Special Representatives
Some of the former Special Representatives include:
 Martti Ahtisaari, United Nations Commissioner for Namibia (1 January 1977–1 April 1982); Special Representative of the Secretary-General and Head of the United Nations Transition Assistance Group (UNTAG) (April 1989–March 1990)
 Jean Arnault, Special Representative of the Secretary-General for Guatemala and Head of the United Nations Verification Mission in Guatemala (MINUGUA) (1997–2000); Special Representative of the Secretary-General for Burundi and Head of the United Nations Office in Burundi (BNUB) (2000–2001);  Special Representative of the Secretary General in Afghanistan and Head of the United Nations Assistance Mission in Afghanistan (UNAMA) (2004–2006), Deputy Special Representative (2002–2003); Special Representative of the Secretary-General for Georgia and Head of the United Nations Observer Mission in Georgia (UNOMIG) (2006–2008); Special Representative of the Secretary-General for Colombia and Head of the United Nations Verification Mission in Colombia (July 2017–December 2018)
 José Victor da Silva Ângelo, Special Representative of the Secretary-General and Head of the United Nations Mission in the Central African Republic and Chad (31 January 2008–31 December 2010)
 Louise Arbour, Special Representative of the Secretary-General for International Migration (9 March 2017–31 December 2018)
 Zainab Bangura, Special Representative of the Secretary-General on Sexual Violence in Conflict (22 June 2012–12 April 2017)
 Natalio Ecarma III, Special Representative of the Secretary-General for the United Nations Disengagement Observer Force in the Golan Heights (10 March 2010–13 August 2013)
 Yash Ghai, Special Representative of the Secretary-General for human rights in Cambodia (1 November 2005–2008)
 Julian Harston, Special Representative of the Secretary-General in Haiti (1997–1999); Special Representative of the Secretary-General for United Nations Mission for the Referendum in Western Sahara; Deputy Special Representative of the Secretary General for the United Nations Mission in Bosnia and Herzegovina (UNMIBH) (1999–April 2001); Special Representative of the Secretary-General and Director of the United Nations Office in Belgrade (March–November 2009)
 Sukehiro Hasegawa, Special Representative of the Secretary-General for East Timor and Head of the United Nations Mission of Support to East Timor (UNMISET) and the United Nations Office in East Timor (21 May 2004–September 2006)
 Hina Jilani, Special Representative of the Secretary-General for Human Rights Defenders (2000–2008)
 Michael Keating, Special Representative of the Secretary-General and Head of the United Nations Assistance Mission in Somalia (UNSOM) (23 November 2015–1 October 2018)
 Jacques Paul Klein, Special Representative of the Secretary General for the United Nations Mission in Bosnia and Herzegovina (UNMIBH) (2001–2003); Special Representative of the Secretary-General for United Nations Mission in Liberia (2003–2005)
 Bernard Kouchner, Special Representative of the Secretary-General for Kosovo (15 July 1999–12 January 2001)
 Deborah Lyons, Special Representative of the Secretary-General for Afghanistan and Head of the United Nations Assistance Mission in Afghanistan (UNAMA) (24 March 2020–16 June 2022)
 Ian Martin, Special Representative of the Secretary-General and Head of United Nations Mission in Nepal (2006–2009); Special Representative of the Secretary-General and Head of the United Nations Support Mission in Libya (11 September 2011–14 October 2012)
 Ad Melkert, Special Representative of the Secretary-General for the United Nations Assistance Mission for Iraq (7 July 2009–1 October 2011)
 David Nabarro, Special Representative of the Secretary-General on Food Security and Nutrition (2009–2017)
 Jan Pronk, Special Representative of the Secretary-General for the United Nations Mission in Sudan (UNMIS) (1 July 2004–10 December 2006)
 John Reedman, Special Representative of the Secretary-General in Palestine
 John Ruggie, Special Representative of the Secretary-General on human rights and transnational corporations and other business enterprises (2005–2011)
 William L. Swing, Special Representative of the Secretary-General for Western Sahara and Head of the United Nations Mission for the Referendum in Western Sahara (MINURSO) (2001–2003); Special Representative of the Secretary-General and Head of the United Nations Organization Stabilization Mission in the Democratic Republic of the Congo (May 2003–January 2008)
 Peter Sutherland, Special Representative of the Secretary-General for International Migration (12 January 2006–9 March 2017)
 James Swan, Special Representative of the Secretary-General for Somalia and Head of the United Nations Assistance Mission in Somalia (UNSOM) (30 May 2019–27 October 2022)
 Sérgio Vieira de Mello, Special Representative of the Secretary-General for Kosovo (13 June 1999–15 July 1999); Special Representative of the Secretary-General for East Timor (December 1999–May 2002); and Special Representative of the Secretary-General for Iraq (2003–2004)
 Mohamed Sahnoun, Special Representative of the Secretary-General for Somalia and Head of the United Nations Operation in Somalia I (UNOSOM I) (April–November 1992)
 Abdallah Wafy, Deputy Special Representative of the Secretary-General for the Democratic Republic of the Congo and the United Nations Organization Stabilization Mission in the Democratic Republic of the Congo (MONUSCO) (2013–2015)
 Leila Zerrougui, Special Representative of the Secretary-General for the Democratic Republic of the Congo and the United Nations Organization Stabilization Mission in the Democratic Republic of the Congo (MONUSCO) (January 2018–February 2021)

Special Advisers
 Juan E. Méndez, Special Adviser on the Prevention of Genocide

See also
 Special Representative of the Secretary-General for East Timor
 Special Representative of the Secretary-General for Kosovo
 Special Representative of the Secretary-General for Western Sahara
 High Representative for Bosnia and Herzegovina
 Special Envoy of the Secretary-General

References

External links
List of Special Representatives of the Secretary General